Excoecaria acerifolia is a species of flowering plant in the family Euphorbiaceae. It was described in 1857. It is native to Yunnan, China. It is monoecious.

References

acerifolia
Plants described in 1857
Flora of China